Mohammed Dahman (born 8 May 1959) is a Syrian former international footballer who participated in Football at the 1980 Summer Olympics.

References

Living people
Syrian footballers
Syria international footballers
Footballers at the 1980 Summer Olympics
Olympic footballers of Syria
1959 births
Association football defenders
1980 AFC Asian Cup players
1984 AFC Asian Cup players